A dust devil (also known regionally as a "dirt devil") is a strong, well-formed, and relatively short-lived whirlwind. Its size ranges from small (half a metre wide and a few metres tall) to large (more than 10 m wide and more than 1 km tall). The primary vertical motion is upward. Dust devils are usually harmless, but can on rare occasions grow large enough to pose a threat to both people and property.

They are comparable to tornadoes in that both are a weather phenomenon involving a vertically oriented rotating column of wind. Most tornadoes are associated with a larger parent circulation, the mesocyclone on the back of a supercell thunderstorm. Dust devils form as a swirling updraft under sunny conditions during fair weather, rarely coming close to the intensity of a tornado.

Formation 

Dust devils form when a pocket of hot air near the surface rises quickly through cooler air above it, forming an updraft. If conditions are just right, the updraft may begin to rotate. As the air rapidly rises, the column of hot air is stretched vertically, thereby moving mass closer to the axis of rotation, which causes intensification of the spinning effect by conservation of angular momentum. The secondary flow in the dust devil causes other hot air to speed horizontally inward to the bottom of the newly forming vortex. As more hot air rushes in toward the developing vortex to replace the air that is rising, the spinning effect becomes further intensified and self-sustaining. A dust devil, fully formed, is a funnel-like chimney through which hot air moves, both upwards and in a circle. As the hot air rises, it cools, loses its buoyancy and eventually ceases to rise.  As it rises, it displaces air which descends outside the core of the vortex. This cool air returning acts as a balance against the spinning hot-air outer wall and keeps the system stable.

The spinning effect, along with surface friction, usually will produce a forward momentum. The dust devil may be sustained if it moves over nearby sources of hot surface air.

As available hot air near the surface is channeled up the dust devil, eventually surrounding cooler air will be sucked in. Once this occurs, the effect is dramatic, and the dust devil dissipates in seconds. Usually this occurs when the dust devil is moving slowly (depletion) or begins to enter a terrain where the surface temperatures are cooler.

Certain conditions increase the likelihood of dust devil formation.
 Flat barren terrain, desert or tarmac: Flat conditions increase the likelihood of the hot-air "fuel" being a near constant. Dusty or sandy conditions will cause particles to become caught up in the vortex, making the dust devil easily visible, but are not necessary for the formation of the vortex.
 Clear skies or lightly cloudy conditions: The surface needs to absorb significant amounts of solar energy to heat the air near the surface and create ideal dust devil conditions.
 Light or no wind and cool atmospheric temperature: The underlying factor for sustainability of a dust devil is the extreme difference in temperature between the near-surface air and the atmosphere. Windy conditions will destabilize the spinning effect of a dust devil.

Intensity and duration 
On Earth, many dust devils are usually small and weak, often less than 3 feet (0.9 m) in diameter with maximum winds averaging about 45 miles per hour (70 km/h), and they often dissipate less than a minute after forming. On rare occasions, a dust devil can grow very large and intense, sometimes reaching a diameter of up to 300 feet (90 m) with winds in excess of 60 mph (100 km/h+) and can last for upwards of 20 minutes before dissipating. Because of their small diameter, Coriolis force is not significant in the dust devil itself so dust devils with anticyclonic rotation do occur.

Hazards

Dust devils typically do not cause injuries, but rare, severe dust devils have caused damage and even deaths in the past. One such dust devil struck the Coconino County Fairgrounds in Flagstaff, Arizona, on September 14, 2000, causing extensive damage to several temporary tents, stands and booths, as well as some permanent fairgrounds structures. Several injuries were reported, but there were no fatalities. Based on the degree of damage left behind, it is estimated that the dust devil produced winds as high as 75 mph (120 km/h), which is equivalent to an EF0 tornado. On May 19, 2003, a dust devil lifted the roof off a two-story building in Lebanon, Maine, causing it to collapse and kill a man inside.<ref>NCDC: Event Details  National Climatic Data Center'.' Retrieved 2008-06-05.</ref> On June 18, 2008, a woman near Casper, Wyoming was killed when a dust devil caused a small scorer's shed at a youth baseball field to flip on top of her. She had been trying to shelter from the dust devil by going behind the shed. In East El Paso, Texas in 2010, three children in an inflatable jump house were picked up by a dust devil and lifted over 10 feet (3 m), traveling over a fence and landing in a backyard three houses away.This rare weather incident was the subject of a United States Air Force Weather Squadron study: Clarence Giles, "Air Force Weather Squadron forecasts, studies weather to keep servicemembers safe", http://fortblissbugle.com/air-force-weather-squadron-forecasts-studies-weather-to-keep-servicemembers-safe/  Fort Bliss Bugle, Unit News p.1A (January 12, 2011) In Commerce City, Colorado in 2018, a powerful dust devil hurtled two porta-potties into the air. No one was injured in the incident. In 2019, a large dust devil in Yucheng county, Henan province, China killed 2 children and injured 18 children and 2 adults when a bouncy castle was lifted into the air.

Dust devils have been implicated in around 100 aircraft accidents. While many incidents have been simple taxiing problems, a few have had fatal consequences. Dust devils are also considered major hazards among skydivers and paragliding pilots as they can cause a parachute or a paraglider to collapse with little to no warning, at altitudes considered too low to cut away, and contribute to the serious injury or death of parachutists. He later died from the injuries he sustained.

 Electrical activities 
Dust devils, even small ones (on Earth), can produce radio noise and electrical fields greater than 10,000 volts per meter. A dust devil picks up small dirt and dust particles. As the particles whirl around, they become electrically charged through contact or frictional charging (triboelectrification). The whirling charged particles also create a magnetic field that fluctuates between 3 and 30 times each second.

These electric fields may assist the vortices in lifting material off the ground and into the atmosphere. Field experiments indicate that a dust devil can lift 1 gram of dust per second from each square metre (10 lb/s from each acre) of ground over which it passes. A large dust devil measuring about 100 metres (330 ft) across at its base can lift about 15 metric tonnes (17 short tons) of dust into the air in 30 minutes. Giant dust storms that sweep across the world's deserts contribute 8% of the mineral dust in the atmosphere each year during the handful of storms that occur. In comparison, the significantly smaller dust devils that twist across the deserts during the summer lift about three times as much dust, thus having a greater combined impact on the dust content of the atmosphere. When this occurs, they are often called sand pillars.

 Martian dust devils 

 Alternate names 
In Australia, a Dust Devil is more commonly known as "Willy willy".
In Ireland, Dust Devils are known as "Shee-gaoithe" or "Fairy wind"

 Related phenomena 

 Ash devils 
Hot cinders underneath freshly deposited ash in recently burned areas may sometimes generate numerous dust devils. The lighter weight and the darker color of the ash may create dust devils that are visible hundreds of feet into the air.

Ash devils form similar to dust devils and are often seen on unstable days in burn scar areas of recent fires.

Coal devils are common at the coal town of Tsagaan Khad in South Gobi Province, Mongolia. They occur when dust devils pick up large amounts of stockpiled coal. Their dark color makes them resemble some tornadoes.

 Fire whirls 

Fire whirls or swirls, sometimes called fire devils or fire tornadoes, can be seen during intense fires in combustible building structures or, more commonly, in forest or bush fires. A fire whirl is a vortex-shaped formation of burning gases being released from the combustible material. The genesis of the vortex is probably similar to that of a dust devil. As distinct from the dust devil, it is improbable that the height reached by the fire gas vortex is greater than the visible height of the vertical flames because of turbulence in the surrounding gases that inhibit creation of a stable boundary layer between the rotating/rising gases relative to the surrounding gases.

Snow devils
The same conditions can produce a snow whirlwind, snow devil'' or sometimes referred to as a “snownado”, although differential heating is more difficult in snow-covered areas.

Steam devils 

Steam devils are a small vortex column of saturated air of varying height but small diameter forming when cold air lay over a much warmer body of water or saturated surface. They are also often observed in the steam rising from power plants.

References

External links 

 Australian Dust Devil Photos
 Dancing with the Devils Video
 Dust Devil Imaged by Spirit Rover on Mars
 Matador Dust Devil Project
 Page with many movies of Martian dust devils as seen by Spirit, with enhanced images as well as ratings.
 The Bibliography of Aeolian Research

Dust storms
Wind
Vortices
Mars
Articles containing video clips
Microscale meteorology